Iulian Teodor Ştefan (born 24 July 1980) is a Romanian former football midfielder. In his career Ștefan played mainly for Pandurii Târgu Jiu, but also for teams such as Farul Constanța or UTA Arad.

Honours
Pandurii Târgu Jiu
Liga II: 2004–05

References

1980 births
Living people
Footballers from Bucharest
Romanian footballers
Association football midfielders
Liga I players
FCV Farul Constanța players
FC UTA Arad players
Liga II players
CS Pandurii Târgu Jiu players